The 2017 Adelaide Football Club season is the 27th season in the Australian Football League and the 1st season in the AFL Women's competition contested by the Adelaide Football Club.

AFL

List changes

Matthew Jaensch, who suffered a knee injury in round 7 of 2015, had not played a game for the rest of that season and decided to retire from AFL at the beginning of the 2016 season. Former captain Nathan van Berlo also decided to retire at the end of 2016 after struggling to get a spot in the AFL team. He finished out the season playing in the SANFL finals campaign. The Crows also delisted Luke Lowden and Keenan Ramsey at the end of the season.

After the trade period they delisted two more players: midfielder Mitch Grigg and utility Ricky Henderson. The final player to be dropped off of the senior list was Sam Shaw, who retired due to the effects concussion was having on his career. He was later re-drafted in the rookie draft to give him access to welfare assistance.

With the Crows' first pick in the national draft they selected Jordan Gallucci, a midfielder from Eastern Ranges in the TAC Cup. Originally this was selection 13, but it dropped to 15 due to bids made on academy players. Son of two-time Crows premiership player Darren Jarman, Ben Jarman, was eligible for the Crows to select him as a father-son selection. The Crows decided not to use this to select him in the national draft, but Jarman was overlooked and, when no club opted to take part in the 2017 pre-season draft, the Crows were able to select him automatically with their final selection in the rookie draft.

Retirements and delistings

Trades

National draft

Rookie draft

Squad

Season summary

Pre-season

Week 1

Week 2

Week 3

Home and Away season

Richmond failed to meet expectations and the Crows won by 76 points. Undefeated after six games, the Crows were on top of the ladder with their best start to any season.

Now premiership favourites, the Crows expected an easy win against , who had only won one game and were on the bottom of the ladder. They were then shell-shocked when North Melbourne kept them scoreless for the first quarter and won the game by 59 points. The Crows tried to bounce back the next week against , and the led by 28 points halfway through the second quarter, but Melbourne went on to kick the next nine goals and won by 41 points. Geelong led from start to finish and ended up winning by 22 points, Geelong's tenth win in a row against Adelaide at Simonds Stadium. The Crows then went into the bye after beating  by 57 points on top of the ladder with 9 wins and 3 losses.

After this, they played against  at the MCG. The Crows went into the game as clear favourites to win, but after a slow start they were trailing by 38 points at half-time. When Collingwood kicked two quick goals to start the third quarter, the lead was extended to 50 points. Adelaide kicked 9 of the next 10 goals to bring the margin back to 3 points early in the final quarter, but they were unable to take the lead. Collingwood kicked three goals in a row to take the margin back out to 21 points, but the Crows came back again and in the dying seconds Collingwood's lead had been diminished to 6 points. Mitch McGovern took a huge pack mark for the Crows seconds before the siren went, and he kicked a goal after the siren to draw the game. This was the Crows' first draw since 1994.

In Round 22, they played against , who after starting winless had won 13 of their last 15 games and were challenging for a spot in the top four. They had another slow start, but fought back to lead in the second half. The Crows were inaccurate in front of goals, so in spite of having seven more scoring shots than the Swans, they lost by three points. In their final game the Crows played  in the final ever AFL game at Domain Stadium, where the Crows lost by 29 points. This was enough for West Coast to make the top eight, beating  on percentage by half a percent, and because Geelong had beaten the Giants, the Crows finished minor premiers in spite of losing their last two games.

Round 1

Round 2

Round 3

Round 4

Round 5

Round 6

Round 7

Round 8

Round 9

Round 10

Round 11

Round 12

Round 14

Round 15

Round 16

Round 17

Round 18

Round 19

Round 20

Round 21

Round 22

Round 23

Finals

When Rory Sloane had surgery to have his appendix removed before the finals, the Crows were forced to play without him in the first week. Without Sloane, the Crows still thrived in wet conditions, keeping  to just 11 points, the lowest half-time score in a final since the 1960 VFL Grand Final. The Crows went on to win by 36 points after leading at half time by 44 points, setting up a home preliminary final. This came at the cost of defender Brodie Smith, who tore his ACL in the first quarter, ending his season and putting into question whether he'd play in 2018.

Due to the bye week before the finals, there was concern that the Crows would have trouble after only playing two games in the month leading up to the preliminary final. After having the week off and  beating  in the Second Semi-Final, it was announced that Adelaide would be playing Geelong on Friday night at Adelaide Oval. To prepare during the week off, the Crows played a match simulation. At this simulation, key forward Mitch McGovern injured his hamstring.

At the preliminary final, Sloane returned from his appendicitis and Andy Otten was brought into the team to replace McGovern. The Crows had another fast start, scoring six goals to one in the first quarter and leading by 48 points early in the second quarter on their way to a 61-point win. This win put them through to their first grand final since their 1998 premiership.

Adelaide played in the 2017 AFL Grand Final against . They led at quarter time by 11 points, but Richmond went on to kick the next seven goals and win the match by 48 points, their first premiership since 1980.

First Qualifying Final

First Preliminary Final

Grand Final

Ladder

AFL Women's

After finishing second in the ladder, Adelaide won the first AFLW grand final by defeating Brisbane Lions 4.11 (31) to 4.5 (25).

The Crows started the first-ever AFL Women's season strongly, winning their first four matches, and spending three of the first four rounds at the top of the ladder. Adelaide then faced a crucial home match against Brisbane, the other undefeated team, and narrowly lost at home in front of over 10,000. A win in the next game, played in Darwin, would seal a finals appearance for the Crows, but after being down 14 points late in the fourth quarter two late goals were not enough to overcome Melbourne. Needing a win in their final against Collingwood to make the grand final, the Crows came back to win. After being down at three-quarter time by 7 points, the Crows scored 32 points in the final quarter while holding the Magpies to only a behind.

Adelaide started the grand final strongly with a goal only 20 seconds into the match by Kellie Gibson. In front the whole match after that kick, the Crows weathered a late comeback to win the first-ever AFLW final by six points.

2017 Squad

Regular season

Ladder

2017 Grand Final

SANFL

This is the 4th season in the South Australian National Football League contested by the Adelaide Football Club.

Ladder

References

Adelaide Football Club seasons
Adelaide
Adelaide